The Japan national football team in 2018, managed by head coach Vahid Halilhodžić, head coach Akira Nishino and head coach Hajime Moriyasu compete in the 2018 FIFA World Cup and international friendly matches both at home and abroad.

Record

Kits

|

Matches

Players statistics

Goalscorers

References

External links
Japan Football Association

Japan national football team results
2018 in Japanese football
Japan